The M109 is an American 155 mm turreted self-propelled howitzer, first introduced in the early 1960s to replace the M44. It has been upgraded a number of times, most recently to the M109A7. The M109 family is the most common Western indirect-fire support weapon of maneuver brigades of armored and mechanized infantry divisions.

The M109 has a crew of four: the section chief/commander, the driver, the gunner, and the ammunition handler/loader. The chief or gunner aims the cannon left or right (deflection) and up and down (quadrant).

The British Army replaced its M109s with the AS-90. Several European armed forces have or are currently replacing older M109s with the German PzH 2000. Upgrades to the M109 were introduced by the U.S. (see variants) and by Switzerland (KAWEST). With the cancellation of the U.S. Crusader and Non-Line-of-Sight Cannon, the M109A6 ("Paladin") will likely remain the principal self-propelled howitzer for the U.S. until the new M1299 enters service.

Operational history

The M109 was the medium variant of a U.S. program to adopt a common chassis for its self-propelled artillery units. The light version, the M108 Howitzer, was phased out during the Vietnam War, but many were rebuilt as M109s.

The M109 saw its combat debut in Vietnam. Around 200 vehicles were deployed in 1966, but the entire fleet suffered a mechanical malfunction within a year of operation. The U.S. dispatched engineers and mechanics, but all M109s were recalled back to the U.S. in 1967 after failing to repair in the field. The howitzer underwent upgrades afterward, which resulted in the M109A1 variant that went into production in 1970.

Israel used the M109 against Egypt in the 1973 Yom Kippur War and in the 1982 and 2006 Lebanon Wars. Iran used the M109 in the Iran–Iraq War in the 1980s. The M109 saw service with the British, Egyptian and Saudi Arabian Armies in the 1991 Gulf War. The M109 saw service with the U.S. Army in the Gulf War, as well as in the Iraq War from 2003 to 2011.

Upgrades to the cannon, ammunition, fire control, survivability, and other electronics systems over the design's lifespan have expanded the system's capabilities, including tactical nuclear projectiles, guided projectiles (Copperhead), Rocket Assisted Projectiles (RAP), FAmily of SCAtterable Mines (FASCAM), and cluster munitions (the Dual-Purpose Improved Conventional Munition, DPICM).

In August 2015, South Korean K55A1s fired rounds behind the Military Demarcation Line as a warning after several North Korean provocations.

During the 2022 Russian invasion of Ukraine, Ukraine used M109 howitzers which were donated by Western countries.

Design
The M109 was developed by the Ground System Division of United Defense LP, now BAE Systems Land and Armaments.

Armament

 Primary by Watervliet Arsenal: M126 Cannon (or M126A1) 155 mm Howitzer (M109), M185 Cannon 155 mm Howitzer (A1/A2/A3/A4), or M284 Cannon 155 mm Howitzer (A5/A6)
 Secondary: .50 caliber (12.7 mm) M2 machine gun, Mk 19 Mod 3 40 mm Automatic Grenade Launcher, 7.62 mm M60, M240 machine gun or L4 machine gun

Hypervelocity Projectile (HVP)
In January 2016, the U.S. Army test-fired hypervelocity projectiles originally designed for use by U.S. Navy electromagnetic railguns. They found that they significantly increased the gun's range. The Army is looking into using the M109 Paladin firing the HVP for ballistic missile defense, as traditional missile interceptors are expensive, and gun-based missile defense used for point defense would use artillery at a much lower cost per round.  

It weighs  with a  flight body containing its guidance and warhead—less powerful, but more agile to hit small, high-speed targets. Modifications will be needed for the Paladin to effectively shoot the HVP, possibly including different propellant to achieve higher velocities, automated reloading systems to fire quickly enough to defeat salvo launches, improved barrel life, and a new fire control and sensor system. During a test of the Air Force's Advanced Battle Management System (ABMS) in September 2020, an HVP fired from an Army Paladin howitzer successfully intercepted a BQM-167 target drone simulating a cruise missile.

Variants

M109
First produced in 1963. It had a 155 mm M126 Cannon in an M127 Mount, and carried 28 rounds of 155 mm ammunition. It was also armed with a .50cal M2HB machine gun with 500 rounds of ammunition. Easily identified by its short barrel and a double baffle muzzle brake with a large fume extractor just behind it. Maximum range of 14,600 meters.

M109A1

Replaced the M126 Cannon with a 39 caliber M185 Cannon, featuring a longer barrel while increasing maximum range to 18,100 meters.

M109A2
Incorporated 27 Reliability, Availability, and Maintainability (RAM) mid-life improvements. Most notably, the long barreled 155 mm M185 Cannon in the new M178 gun mount, ballistic protection for the panoramic telescope, counterbalanced travel lock, and the ability to mount the M140 bore sight alignment device. Stowage of 155mm rounds increased from 28 to 36 rounds; .50cal ammunition remained at 500 rounds. During M109A2 production, a slightly simplified version was also produced for export. This had minor internal changes and deleted the hull flotation feature. These were designated M109A1B.

M109A3 and M109A3B
M109A1s and M109A1Bs rebuilt to M109A2 standard respectively. Some A3s feature three contact arm assemblies, while all A2s have five.

M109A4
M109A2s and M109A3s improved with Nuclear, Biological, and Chemical / Reliability, Availability, and Maintainability (NBC/RAM) improvements, including air purifiers, heaters, and Mission Oriented Protective Posture (MOPP) (protective) gear.

The traversing mechanism's clutch was hydraulic, as compared to the electric mechanism on previous M109s, and featured a manual override. The M109A4 gained a second hydraulic filter, and also included an improvement to the engine starting equipment which greatly improved the ability to start in an emergency.

Ammunition stowage remained the same as in previous models.

M109A5

Replaces the 155 mm M185 Cannon in an M178 Mount with a 39-caliber 155 mm M284 Cannon in an M182 Mount, giving the A5 a maximum range of 22,000 meters with unassisted projectiles and 30,000 meters with Rocket Assisted Projectile (RAP) rounds. The vehicle can carry 36 complete rounds of ammunition and has a 440 hp engine instead of the standard 405 hp engine.

M109A5+
Various manufacturers have upgraded the fire control and other components of the M109A5. BAE Systems in York PA recently delivered 12 M109A5+ vehicles to Chile and 40 M109A5+ vehicles for Brazil.

M109A6 "Paladin"

The Paladin model has improvements in the areas of survivability, RAM, and armament. This includes increased armor, a redesigned internal arrangement for safer ammunition and equipment storage, engine and suspension upgrades, and improvement of the M284 Cannon and M182A1 Mount. The greatest difference is the integration of an inertial navigation system, sensors detecting the weapons' lay, automation, and an encrypted digital communication system, which utilizes computer controlled frequency-hopping to avoid enemy electronic warfare and allow the howitzer to send grid location and altitude to the battery Fire Direction Center (FDC). 

The battery FDCs coordinates fire through a battalion or higher FDC. This allows the Paladin to halt from the move and fire within 30 seconds, with an accuracy equivalent to the previous models when properly emplaced, laid, and safed—a process that previously required several minutes under the best of circumstances. Tactically, this improves the system's survivability by allowing the battery to operate dispersed in pairs across the countryside, and allowing the howitzer to quickly move between salvos, or if attacked by indirect fire, aircraft, or ground forces.

Ammunition storage of 155 mm rounds was increased from 36 to 39.

The US Army received the first Paladin in 1994 and the last of 950 in 1999.

M109 "KAWEST"

This Swiss improved version produced by Ruag incorporates a new Swiss-designed L47 155 mm gun with an increased firing range of up to 36 km. It features an inertial navigation system coupled with a new gun-laying system, along with an ammunition storage increase of 40 rounds and 64 charges. The KAWEST (lit. Kampfwertsteigerung = upgrade of combat capabilities) requires only six crew members instead of eight. It is able to fire three-round bursts within 15 seconds, or maintain a constant firing rate of over one round per minute.

Upgraded Swiss PzHb (Panzerhaubitze) 79 and 88 (M109A1) are known as respectively PzHb 79/95 and PzHb 88/95.

M109L52
Jointly developed by the Dutch firm RDM and the German firm Rheinmetall, the M109L52 was first revealed in 2002. The main improvement was replacing the M126 series gun with the longer 52-caliber cannon from the PzH 2000, thus the MTLS ammunition of the PzH 2000 can be used. Improvements to the loading system were also made, resulting in an increased rate of fire from 3 rds/min to 9–10 rds/min, able to be sustained for up to 2 minutes. A total of 35 rounds can be carried.

M109A3GNM
The latest version in service with the Norwegian Army's Artilleribataljonen. 126 M109Gs were acquired from West Germany between 1969 and 1971. They were then upgraded to the M109A3GN configuration during the latter half of the 1980s. In 2006, there were 56 M109A3GNs in the Army's inventory, meaning that at least 70 SPGs had been scrapped after the end of the Cold War. 14 of the M109A3GNs received upgrades in 2007, and were designated M109A3GNM. The upgrade includes a new intercom and new navigation and positioning systems.

In 2020 the 14 units with A3GNM upgrades and those still with A3GN specs were placed in storage because all the new Korean K9 Thunder units had been delivered. In May 2022, Norway donated 22 A3GN-spec M109s to Ukraine. Two M109A3GN howitzers were destroyed and three damaged during the 2022 Russian invasion of Ukraine.

K55
K55 is a South Korean license produced variant of the M109A2. In the 1960s, the South Korean Army received M107 and M110 from the United States. However, the number of these self-propelled guns was insufficient to counter rapidly-growing North Korean artillery capabilities. In the 1970s, South Korea began mass-producing towed howitzers locally, but intelligence reports of North Korean 170 mm self-propelled artillery forced South Korea to look for a new self-propelled artillery system.

In December 1983, the ministers of defense of the United States and South Korea signed a MOU to co-produce M109A2 in South Korea using American technical data. The United States delivered two completed M109A2s to South Korea for operational review, and the Agency for Defense Development began to translate the data package and created field and maintenance manuals for soldiers. South Korea wanted to produce every part of the vehicle domestically; however, due to the amendment bill by Rep. Samuel S. Stratton of New York, which established a limit for foreign military technology cooperation, the turret and the M185 cannon from Watervliet Arsenal were imported from the United States.

Compared to the M109A2, besides 63 percent of parts being produced locally, K55 has a driver's night periscope and light exposure minimization device to enhance night-time operations as well as additional radio systems. The vehicle has an NBC protection system and halon fire extinguishers. A total of 1,180 K55s were produced between 1985 and 1996. The vehicle's name was changed from KM109A2 to K55, originally a code name from the Samsung factory.

In November 1990, the United States and South Korea signed an agreement to allow South Korea to supply M109 parts to third parties. In May 1997, during the Security Cooperation Committee held in Washington D.C., South Korea requested that the United States revise the MOU to export complete K55s, originally intended for domestic use only. South Korea was expecting to export 72 K55s and four ammunition support vehicles to Brazil for $160 million over Belgium's offer, but the United States Department of Defense declined the request to avoid an arms race in the region.

In May 1998, the South Korean military began operating a K55 simulator to boost artillery operator training. The simulator took a year and a billion KRW budget to develop. It is expected to save 150 million KRW per year per device.

K55A1
The K55A1 is a South Korean overhaul and modernization of the K55, augmenting the proven systems of the K9 Thunder and the K9 upgrade plan. The development took three years between 2007 and 2010. The upgrade started in 2010. In November 2010, in the wake of the North Korean artillery attack, the South Korean government authorized a massive increase in military spending. South Korea allocated 11.5 billion KRW on K55A1 upgrades for FY2011, more than a 1500% increase from 700 million KRW for FY2010. The upgrade was performed by Samsung Techwin, and the first vehicle was fielded by the South Korean Army in early 2011.

The K55A1 is fitted with the same electronics and fire control system as the K9. The self-propelled gun has significantly enhanced field operability and accuracy through the installation of Honeywell Aerospace's TALIN 5000 INS (inertial navigation system), a satellite navigation device (GPS), and a speed calibrator. As a result, the vehicle automatically lays the gun in the desired direction and delivers a first round within 45 seconds when stationary, or 75 seconds on the move after receiving the shooting specification, which required 2 minutes and 11 minutes, respectively, on the K55.

With the help of a new semi-autoloader, while charges are still inserted manually, the howitzer can fire 4 rounds per minute, increased from 2 to 3 rounds per minute. The improved suspension, involving a strut-type hydropneumatic buffer from Mottrol Co, Ltd., along with an enhanced chamber, allowed the vehicle to shoot without laying spades at a maximum distance of 32 km using base bleed ammunition. An APU (auxiliary power unit) was installed to operate the howitzer without turning on the main engine.

The Army Consolidated Maintenance Depot joined the K55A1 upgrade, releasing its first results in December 2013. The upgrade cost 20% of the K9 Thunder, 800 million KRW, as of 2021.

M109A7

The newest M109 version for U.S. service is the M109A7, formerly known as the M109A6 Paladin Integrated Management (PIM). The M109A7 shares common chassis components with the Bradley Fighting Vehicle (BFV) such as the engine, transmission, and tracks. This creates commonality with other systems and maximizes cost savings in production, parts inventory, and maintenance personnel. The M109A7's onboard power systems harness technologies originally developed for the Non-Line-of-Sight Cannon.

The electric drive is faster than the previous hydraulic system, and the automatic rammer more consistently rams the round into the gun for consistent velocities and better accuracy. It features a 600-volt onboard power system to accommodate additional armor and future networking technologies as they become ready. The M109A7 can sustain a one-round per-minute rate of fire and a maximum rate of fire of four rounds per minute.

Prototypes of the vehicle underwent government testing in preparation for a Low-Rate Initial Production (LRIP) decision. The testing included RAM, mission and ballistic hull and turret testing. The M109A7 was slated to begin LRIP by 2013. The U.S. Army planned on procuring a fleet of 580 sets of M109A7 howitzers and M992A3 Field Artillery Ammunition Support Vehicles (FAASVs).

In October 2013, the Defense Acquisition Board approved the decision to start M109A7 production. The FY 2014 budget called for $340.8 million in Paladin funding, which would be two dozen vehicle sets at $14.4 million per vehicle. The Army plans to buy 133 vehicles, in 66 one-half vehicle sets starting in 2014. One M109A7 howitzer and two supporting M992A3 ammunition carriers will be destroyed during tests. A Full-Rate Production (FRP) decision was planned for February 2017. 

In October 2013, BAE received a $668 million contract to begin LRIP of the M109A7. The first M109A6 and M992A2 vehicles were rebuilt to M109A7 and M992A3 standards as part of LRIP beginning in summer 2014. LRIP deliveries began in April 2015. The contract for FRP was signed in December 2017, with 48 vehicles slated for construction. The Army plans to upgrade 689 Paladins to A7-standard.

The Army is looking to increase the capabilities of the M109A7. By introducing the new XM1113 rocket-assisted projectile (RAP), it can reach  from the current 39-caliber barrel. An additional XM1113 improvement over the legacy RAP round is the replacement of the high explosive, TNT, with an insensitive munition that is less volatile and less prone to unplanned detonation. The Army is working on an autoloader to increase the sustained rate of fire to 6–10 rounds per minute. 

Another part of the effort is the use of a new supercharged propellant to fire the shells, which required redesigning the howitzer to handle higher pressures. These improvements are being developed under the Extended Range Cannon Artillery (ERCA) program, which upgraded the design so much it was re-designated the M1299. One battalion of vehicles is planned to begin a year-long operational assessment in 2023. The autoloader is planned to be ready in 2025.

Derivatives

M992

The M992 Field Artillery Ammunition Support Vehicle (FAASV) is built on the chassis of the M109. It replaced the M548. Unlike the M548, it is armored. This ammunition vehicle has no turret, but has a taller superstructure to store 93 rounds and an equivalent number of powders and primers.

This vehicle is fitted with a Halon fire suppression system and a weapons mount similar to that on the M109 turret, usually mounting a Mk 19 grenade launcher for local defense against infantry and light armored vehicles.

The vehicle contains a 2-stroke diesel powered auxiliary power unit that can power all non-automotive energy requirements on the FAASV and on the M109.

K66
The K66 was a planned ammunition support vehicle for the K55. As a follow-up to the K55 program, Samsung Aerospace Industries prepared for licensing a local variant of the M992, featuring such modifications as NBC protection and an increase of ammunition storage capacity to 110 rounds, 116 packs of powders, and 132 primers.

In 1987, Samsung Aerospace Industries competed against the Daewoo Heavy Industries' ammunition support vehicle based on the K200 APC. Daewoo Heavy Industries' vehicle was selected as the K66, but failed the test evaluation. The K66 project was cancelled in the mid-1990s, resulting in a lawsuit.

K77 FDCV (Fire Direction Center Vehicle)
The K77 FDCV is a command & control post vehicle variant based on the K55 platform.

K56 ARV (Ammunition Resupply Vehicle)
The K56 ARV is an ammunition resupply vehicle based on the K55 platform. Unlike the K10 ARV, the K56 can resupply both the K55A1 and the K9 Thunder. It has a 45.7% (4,197 out of 9,191 total parts) compatibility with the K55A1.

After 10 months of pilot experiment, the K56 program was authorized by the DAPPC (Defense Acquisition Program Promotion Committee) in February 2007. In May 2007, the DAPPC allocated 16 billion KRW for research and development for 2008 to 2010, with plans to produce 520 vehicles between 2011 and 2020. In June 2008, Samsung Techwin was selected as the main contractor for the project. Later, the development completion schedule was delayed to 2011, while the total production amount was increased to 700 vehicles with a cost of 1.3 trillion KRW between 2012 and 2021.

In September 2010, the Board of Audit and Inspection claimed that the Army was biased during evaluation, and demanded re-analysis of the project regarding inefficiency of the system. The Defense Acquisition Program Administration (DAPA) ignored the Board and continued with the project while the Army purposely delayed complying. In June 2011, the Ministry of Defense again ordered a reexamination of the resupply vehicle. DAPA instead requested a budget for the program, and the development was completed in October 2011. In July 2013, the DAPA announced the 1st production batch of the K56 between 2013 and 2015 for 65 billion KRW.

In December 2015, Hanwha Techwin signed a contract with the DAPA for a 2nd production batch. In January 2018, Hanwha Land Systems announced a 166.4 billion KRW contract with the DAPA for a 3rd production batch and related products. In June 2020, Hanwha Defense announced 380.3 billion KRW contract with the DAPA for a 4th production batch. South Korea plans a 5th production batch and to achieve full operational capability by 2025. All K56s were delivered to the western front.

Training systems
The US Army uses the Fire Support Combined Arms Tactical Trainer (FSCATT) in two versions, for initial and sustainment training of the M109A6 and M109A5. The system uses an actual surplus turret and a simulated ammunition system.

The Swiss Army uses a highly advanced KAWEST trainer from Van Halteren Metaal of the Netherlands.

The Dutch, Belgian, Thai, and Israeli Armies have various configurations of the Van Halteren Metaal M109 Howitzer Crew Trainer (HCT).

The US Army PEO STRI had a program called M109A7 Howitzer Crew Trainer (HCT). The plan was to procure 16 systems beginning in the 3rd Quarter of FY 20.

Successors 
The U.S. Army sought to replace the M109 with the XM2001 Crusader, initially part of the Armored Systems Modernization program. The program was canceled in 2002 amid criticism that the program was not in line with the Army's long-term plans for lighter armored brigades. Funding was redirected to the Future Combat Systems Manned Ground Vehicles program, which produced the 18-ton XM1203 Non-Line-of-Sight Cannon as the program's lead effort. The Pentagon terminated the MGV program in 2009 due to concerns over its affordability. The U.S. Army's M1299 howitzer was planned to be completed in 2021 and will undergo operational assessment in 2023.

Operators

Current operators

M109

M109A1
 : 10
 : 17
 : 51 A1B
 : 440
 : 44 M109A1B
 : 15 A0
 : 12
 : 224 (upgraded to M109 KAWEST)
 : 40 (from Switzerland)

M109A2/A3

 : 40 A3 (former Belgian)
 : 84 A2, 50 A3GEA1, 223 A3GEA2
 : 400 A2
 : 356 A2/A2-90 (121 M109A2-90 purchased from Netherlands)
 : 12 A3 
 : 78 M109A2, 22 M109A3 and 40 M-109L47
 : 785 A2 in service with the Pakistan Army. Being upgraded to M109A5 standard.
 : 6 A2 in 2022
 : 60 A2s are currently being upgraded to A5s (2010)
 : 6 (Spanish Marines)
 : 19–20 A2 (former Belgian)
 : 22 A3GN (donated by Norway)

M109A2/A5
 : 33 A2/A5Ö
 : 59 A5Ö
  (Taiwan): 197
 : 6 units, previously owned by Latvia

M109A4
 : 36 units M109A4-BE bought from Belgium
 : 4 M109A4
 : 28 units, previously owned by Belgium, bought, refurbished and donated by the UK.

M109A5

 : 96 A5/A5+ More 56 surplus U.S. Army, to be upgraded to M109A5+, contract awarded to BAE Systems.
 : 48 (24 from Switzerland, upgraded to M-109 KAWEST, 12 A3 and 12 A5+ Upgrade to similar Paladin configuration)
 : 201
 : 36
 : 90 
 : 600
 : ca. 115 in 2022
  : 18 since 2002 (Portuguese Army). 6 of these vehicles were M109A2/A3 upgraded to A5 variant. This variant replaced the previous 6 M109A2 operated by the Portuguese Army.
 : 20
 : 12
 : 96 (Spanish Army)
 : 70
 : 74 TBD
  (Taiwan): 28

M109A6 Paladin

 : ca. 514 in service + ca. 850 in storage in 2022
 : 177 ordered in April 2018.
  (Taiwan) (Cancelled): >100 planned in 2019, 40 approved by U.S. State Department in August 2021. However, the US has since cancelled the order, possibly in the wake of ramping up support for Ukraine, forcing Taiwan to consider alternative options.
 : 18 (pledged by the US)

M109A7
 : 48 with a further 180 contracted options

K55/K55A1
 : 1,180 K55s were produced by Samsung Aerospace Industries between 1985 and 1996. All vehicles are undergoing upgrade to K55A1 since 2010. Operated by the Army and the Marine Corps.

Former operators

M109A2/A3
 : 167 A2, of which 64 were upgraded to the -A4BE standard, 31 sold to Brazil (1999–2001), 43 sold to Morocco (2008), the remainder sold to private companies in 2015.
 : 2–6 (upgraded to M109 A3DK, used to be 76)
 : 570 A3GE A1/A2, phased out by 1 July 2007 and replaced by the PzH 2000
 : 221 M109L (M109 modernized to A3 equivalent with Italian-made 155 mm/39 calibre barrels), replaced by PzH 2000
 : Unknown when entered service or when withdrawn
 : 126 as of 1998, replaced by the PzH 2000, 5 sold to Austria (1997), 87 to United Arab Emirates (1997), 121 to Jordan (2011–2012))
 : 33 in storage after donation of 22 to Ukraine in 2022. 55 in storage in 2021. Inventory of 14 M109A3GNM + 42 M109A3GN in 2019.
 : 6 A2 since 1981 (Portuguese Army). Currently retired from active service and replaced by 18 M109A5 in 2002.
 : 140+ entered service in 1965, upgraded to -A1 and -A2 standards, 83 sold to Austria in 1994 (51 A2, 32 A3)

M109A4
 : 64 A4BE of which 36 A4BE sold to Indonesia (2017–2018), the others to private companies in 2015. From these 28 units were bought by the UK to be delivered to Ukraine.
 : 76 A4B+. Used by the Canadian Forces from 1967 until 2005, when they were phased out. All the vehicles had been modernized to the M109A4B+ SPH standard in the 1980s. They were primarily used by the 4 Canadian Mechanized Brigade Group in Germany.

International equivalents 
 2S3 Akatsiya – Soviet/Russian equivalent
 2S19 Msta – Soviet/Russian equivalent
 2S35 Koalitsiya-SV – Russian equivalent
 AHS Krab - Polish equivalent
 PzH 2000 – German equivalent
 GCT 155mm – French equivalent
 AS-90 – British equivalent
 K9 Thunder – South Korean howitzer developed by Samsung Techwin
 152mm SpGH DANA - Army of the Slovak Republic
 Type 75/Type 99 – Japanese equivalent 
 Palmaria - Italian equivalent built for export
 PLZ-05 – Chinese equivalent
 Sholef - Israeli equivalent (prototype) 
 Bandkanon 1 – armored self-propelled L/50 155 mm gun for the Swedish Army from 1967 to 2003

See also
 List of artillery
 List of land vehicles of the U.S. Armed Forces
 M107 standard 155mm High Explosive (HE) projectile
 M549 HE Rocket Assisted (HERA) projectile
 M864 Dual-Purpose Improved Conventional Munition (DPICM)
 M795, a more lethal, longer range version of the M107 HE projectile

Notes

External links

 Gary's Combat Vehicle Reference Guide
 M109A7 155mm self-propelled tracked howitzer artillery vehicle (United States) on armyrecognition.com
 Fas.org
 Globalsecurity.org
 Israeli-weapons.com
 M109 Technical Manuals M109 Technical Library & M109 Spare Parts

155 mm artillery
Self-propelled howitzers of the United States
Tracked self-propelled howitzers
BAE Systems land vehicles
Cold War artillery of the United States
Military vehicles introduced in the 1960s